Breakin’ Convention is an international hip-hop theatre festival based in London, England that was founded in 2004 and is produced annually by Sadler's Wells theatre. It has been under the artistic direction of playwright and dancer Jonzi D since its inception. Since May 2008 Breakin’ Convention has expanded its activity beyond the three-day festival to include tours across the UK, developing new theatre work with local hip-hop artists, and to produce year-round professional development courses for UK-based hip-hop choreographers, artists, and dance/theatre companies.

Festival origin
Early in 2004, Jonzi D and recently appointed Artistic Director and Chief Executive of Sadler's Wells, Alistair Spalding, proposed the idea of a hip hop festival that took over the entire venue celebrating hip hop culture with an emphasis on dance. Jonzi D was appointed as an Associate Artist at the theatre in March 2005 and founded Still Brock Productions (later: Jonzi D Productions) to focus on education and professional development of hip hop dance in the UK. Breakin' Convention brought over early pioneers of the culture including The Electric Boogaloos, Tommy The Clown and Vagabond Crew, and introduced future award-winning companies such as ZooNation and Boy Blue Entertainment.

Breakin' Convention is supported by Arts Council England.

See also

List of hip hop music festivals
Hip hop culture
Battle of the Year
The Notorious IBE

References

External links
Breakin' Convention official website
Sadler's Wells official website
Breakin' Convention 2009 2MF magazine feature

Theatre festivals in England
Festivals in London
Dance festivals in the United Kingdom
Hip hop music festivals
Music festivals established in 2004
Hip hop theatre festivals
Music festivals in England